Alexander Conrad (born 15 November 1966) is a German former professional footballer, who played as a centre-back, and later manager.

References

1966 births
Living people
German footballers
Association football central defenders
Germany under-21 international footballers
Eintracht Frankfurt players
Borussia Dortmund players
TSV 1860 Munich players
FC Rot-Weiß Erfurt players
FSV Frankfurt players
Bundesliga players
2. Bundesliga players
German football managers
SV Waldhof Mannheim managers
FSV Frankfurt managers
Footballers from Frankfurt